An EMD GP38AC is a 4-axle diesel-electric locomotive built by General Motors Electro-Motive Division between February 1970 and December 1971.  It was basically a GP38 with an AR10 alternator instead of the GP38's normal generator.

261 examples of this model were built; railroads that purchased this model include CP, DT&I, GTW, GM&O, IC, LV, L&N, N&W, SLSF, SOU and Pacific Power and Light.

Many were upgraded to full GP38-2 status with the Dash 2 modular electrical cabinet.

Original Buyers

Preservation

In June 2020 BNSF 2127, originally Frisco 650 built in February 1971, was donated to the Galveston Railroad Museum, in Galveston, Texas.

References 

 
 
 Sarberenyi, Robert. EMD GP38 and GP38AC Original Owners

GP38AC
B-B locomotives
Diesel-electric locomotives of the United States
Railway locomotives introduced in 1970
Freight locomotives
Standard gauge locomotives of the United States
Standard gauge locomotives of Canada
Diesel-electric locomotives of Canada